Roland Michener Secondary School is an English and French Immersion public high school in South Porcupine, Ontario. The school was built in 1969 and named after Daniel Roland Michener, the 20th Governor General of Canada. Michener has visited the school many times before his death in 1991. In 2019, the school celebrated their 50th anniversary and a reunion was held for former students.

See also
List of high schools in Ontario

External links
Board of Education website
Roland Michener Secondary School website

High schools in Timmins
Educational institutions in Canada with year of establishment missing